Martin B. Lohmann (August 27, 1881 – May 29, 1980) was an American businessman and politician.

Lohmann was born in Groveland Township, Tazewell County, Illinois. Lohmann was in the insurance and real estate business. He lived in Pekin, Illinois with his wife and family. Lohmann served on the Pekin City Council and was involved with the Democratic Party. Lohmann served in the Illinois House of Representatives from 1922 to 1932 an in the Illinois Senate from 1932 to 1952. Lohmann died at the Pekin Memorial Hospital in Pekin, Illinois.

Notes

External links

1881 births
1980 deaths
People from Pekin, Illinois
Businesspeople from Illinois
Illinois city council members
Democratic Party Illinois state senators
Democratic Party members of the Illinois House of Representatives
20th-century American politicians
20th-century American businesspeople